U18 European Championship Men 2009 - Division B was an under-18 men's basketball tournament that took place in Bosnia and Herzegovina in July/August 2009. The tournament was won by Sweden who beat Poland 87-71 in the final. Sweden and Poland were promoted to Division A.

Final ranking

1.  Sweden

2.  Israel

3.  Slovenia

4.  Poland

5.  Hungary

6.  Iceland

7.  England

8.  Georgia

9.  Belgium

10.  Denmark

11.  Netherlands

12.  Portugal

13.  Austria

14.  Switzerland

15.  Estonia

16.  Romania

17.  Slovakia

18.  Belarus

19.  Bulgaria

20.  Scotland

21.  Macedonia

22.  Ireland

23.  Albania

24.  Luxembourg

External links
U18 European Championship Men 2009 - Division B website

FIBA U18 European Championship Division B
2009–10 in European basketball
2009–10 in Bosnia and Herzegovina basketball
International youth basketball competitions hosted by Bosnia and Herzegovina